The Silence is a short novel by Don DeLillo. It was published by Scribner on October 20, 2020. An audiobook version was released the same day, narrated by Laurie Anderson, Jeremy Bobb, Marin Ireland, Robin Miles, Jay O. Sanders and Michael Stuhlbarg.

Synopsis
In 2022, on the night of the Super Bowl, Jim Kripps and his wife Tessa Berens are flying from Paris to their home in Newark, New Jersey when their plane crash-lands. In their Manhattan apartment, married couple Diane Lucas and Max Stenner are waiting for Jim and Tessa to arrive to their Super Bowl party. Martin Dekker, one of Diane's former physics students, is the only guest who has arrived. Suddenly, the world's technology systems go dark.

Reception
In its starred review, Kirkus Reviews called it a "vivid" book, and that "in its evocation of people in the throes of social crisis, it feels deeply resonant."

Publishers Weekly praised DeLillo's "mastery of dialogue" and said the work stood out among DeLillo's short fiction but felt "underpowered" compared to his novels.

Screen adaptation
In February 2021, Deadline Hollywood reported that producer Uri Singer acquired the screen rights to The Silence. Singer also produced Noah Baumbach's 2022 film White Noise, an adaptation of Delillo's novel of the same name.

References

2020 American novels
Novels by Don DeLillo
Charles Scribner's Sons books
Fiction set in 2022
Novels set in the 2020s
American novellas